Manohla June Dargis is an American film critic. She is one of the chief film critics for The New York Times. She is a five-time finalist for the Pulitzer Prize for Criticism.

Career
Before being a film critic for The New York Times, Dargis was a chief film critic for the Los Angeles Times, the film editor at the LA Weekly, and a film critic at The Village Voice, where she had two columns on avant-garde cinema ("CounterCurrents" and "Shock Corridor"). Her work has been included in a number of books, including Women and Film: A Sight and Sound Reader and American Movie Critics: An Anthology from the Silents Until Now, published by the Library of America. She wrote a monograph on Curtis Hanson's film L.A. Confidential for the British Film Institute and served as the president and vice-president of the Los Angeles Film Critics Association.

In 2012, Dargis received the Nelson A. Rockefeller Award from Purchase College; the award is, according to the college, "presented to individuals who have distinguished themselves through their contributions to the arts." In 2013, Matt Barone of Complex named her the eighth-greatest film critic of all time. She was also a finalist for the Pulitzer Prize for Criticism in 2013, 2015, 2016, 2018, and 2019.

Preferences

Favorites 
Dargis participated in the 2012 Sight & Sound critics' poll, where she listed her 10 favorite films: 

Au Hasard Balthazar (France, 1966)
Barry Lyndon (USA, 1975)
Flowers of Shanghai (Taiwan, 1998)
The Flowers of St. Francis (Italy, 1950)
The Godfather Part II (USA, 1974)
Little Stabs at Happiness (USA, 1959-1963)
Masculin Féminin (France, 1966)
There Will Be Blood (USA, 2007)
Touch of Evil (USA, 1958)
The Wizard of Oz (USA, 1939)

Best of the Year 
 2004 - Million Dollar Baby
 2005 - A History of Violence
 2006 - Army of Shadows
 2007 - There Will Be Blood
 2008 - Happy-Go-Lucky
 2009 - Unranked
 2010 - Unranked
 2011 - Poetry
 2012 - Amour
 2013 - A Touch of Sin
 2014 - Boyhood
 2015 - (tie) The Assassin; Mad Max: Fury Road
 2016 - No Home Movie 
 2017 - Dunkirk
 2018 - Roma
 2019 - Pain and Glory
 2020 - Martin Eden
 2021 - Drive My Car

Personal life
Dargis grew up in Manhattan's East Village, demonstrating an early love of film through regular attendance at St. Mark's Cinema and Theatre 80. She graduated from Hunter College High School and received her BA in literature from State University of New York at Purchase in January 1985. She received a master of arts in cinema studies in 1988 from the New York University Graduate School of Arts and Science. Dargis married wine expert Lou Amdur in 1994. They live in Los Angeles.

References

External links

List of Dargis film reviews at The New York Times
List of Dargis articles at The New York Times
Interview with Dargis, by Steve Erickson, Senses of Cinema, November 2002.

Living people
20th-century American non-fiction writers
20th-century American women writers
21st-century American women writers
American film critics
American women journalists
Critics employed by The New York Times
Hunter College High School alumni
Los Angeles Times people
New York University alumni
People from the East Village, Manhattan
Place of birth missing (living people)
State University of New York at Purchase alumni
The Village Voice people
American women film critics
Writers from Los Angeles
Writers from Manhattan
Year of birth missing (living people)